The Sikh Channel is a United Kingdom-based, free-to-air, Sikhi-focused satellite television channel. It broadcasts across Europe on satellite television, in Canada and is also streamed live on the internet. The Sikh Channel began to broadcast on 13 April 2009 on Sky channel 840, replacing Brit Hits. The Sikh Channel primarily focuses on education and religious programming for the Sikh community. It operates from a studio in the Aston area of Birmingham.

The Sikh Channel was set up by Davinder Singh Bal in April 2009 by TV Legal Limited. TV Legal formed The Sikh Channel Community Broadcasting Company Limited to accept donations, which are used to pay broadcast and programming costs. The Sikh Channel Community Broadcasting Company Limited became a registered community interest company on 25 September 2009 and a registered charity on 2 June 2010. In December 2012, TV Legal Limited transferred the channel's television broadcast licence to the Sikh Channel Community Interest Company Limited.

On 18 April 2013, the channel launched in Canada as "ATN Sikh Channel" through an exclusive licensing agreement with the Asian Television Network

See also
 Brit Hits
Sikhism in England
Sikhism in United Kingdom

References

External links
Official website

Broadcasting in Birmingham, West Midlands
Religious television channels in the United Kingdom
Sikh mass media
Television channels and stations established in 2009
Sikhism in the United Kingdom